Heart Beats is a 2007 Indian Malayalam-language romantic film starring Indrajith Sukumaran and Simran. It was released in 2007.

Cast
 Indrajith Sukumaran as Binoy Idikkula
 Simran as Thangham George
 Biju Menon as Basheer Ahmed
 Venu Nagavally as Prof Abraham Koshi	
 Cochin Haneefa as Plaparabil Inashu
 Manikuttan as Idikkula
 Arundhathi B as Haritha
 Urmila Unni as Idikkula's mother
 Jagathy Sreekumar as Principal Dr. John Paul
 Anoop Chandran
 Arun Narayanan
 Vijayakumari as Therutha Chedathi
 Tini Tom as Police officer
 Govindankutty as Harikuttan Nair
 T. P. Madhavan as Sreedharan Nair
 Sudheer Sukumaran as Sajin
 E. A. Rajendan as Gopi
 Bindu Ramakrishnan as Hari's mother
 Valsala Menon as Hari's Grandmother
 Soorya J Menon as Idikkula’s lover

Soundtrack 
The film's soundtrack contains 5 songs, all composed by George Peter and Lyrics by Gireesh Puthenchery.

References

2007 films
2000s Malayalam-language films
HIV/AIDS in Indian films